is a Japanese instructor of Shotokan karate.
 
He is currently an instructor of the Japan Karate Association.

Biography
Riki Kumeta was born in Kyoto Prefecture, Japan on ch 9 March 1983. He studied at Kokushikan University.

Competition
Riki Kumeta has had considerable success in karate competition.

Major Tournament Success
54th JKA All Japan Karate Championship (2011) - 2nd Place Kumite
53rd JKA All Japan Karate Championship (2010) - 3rd Place Kumite
52nd JKA All Japan Karate Championship (2009) - 2nd Place Kumite
51st JKA All Japan Karate Championship (2008) - 3rd Place Kata

References

 

1983 births
Japanese male karateka
Karate coaches
Shotokan practitioners
Sportspeople from Kyoto Prefecture
Living people
20th-century Japanese people
21st-century Japanese people